Mannan endo-1,6-alpha-mannosidase (exo-1,6-beta-mannanase, endo-alpha-1->6-D-mannanase, endo-1,6-beta-mannanase, mannan endo-1,6-beta-mannosidase, 1,6-alpha-D-mannan mannanohydrolase) is an enzyme with systematic name 6-alpha-D-mannan mannanohydrolase. This enzyme catalyses the following chemical reaction

 Random hydrolysis of (1->6)-alpha-D-mannosidic linkages in unbranched (1->6)-mannans

References

External links 
 

EC 3.2.1